Saint Hilary of Galeata (Italian: Sant'Ilaro or Sant'Ellero; 476 – 15 May 558) is venerated as a saint in the Roman Catholic and Eastern Orthodox churches. His feast day is 15 May.

According to tradition, he was born in Tuscia in 476, and he decided to dedicate himself to the life of a hermit at the age of twelve.   He left his home, and traveled across the Apennines towards Emilia and chose a spot, according to tradition, pointed out to him by an angel, on a mountain in the valley of the Bidente near the Ronco River.  According to tradition, at the age of twenty, he freed a local nobleman, Olibrius, from a demon.   In gratitude, Olibrius had his entire family christened by Hilary, and donated to the saint lands and money.   In addition, two of Olibrius’ sons joined Hilary in the religious life.  Around 496, then, this became the nucleus of the monastery of Galeata, later called Sant'Ellero di Galeata.   The foundation attracted new recruits, and the monastery followed a version of the rule of Saint Pachomius.  Numerous miracles are attributed to Hilary.  Hilary transformed a grape into a serpent in order to teach a lazy monk named Glicerio a lesson.  Hilary also managed to impress Theodoric, who had originally been harassing the monks and who had been building a palace near Galeata, into donating land and goods.

Veneration

The author of Hilary’s Vita claims that he is a disciple and eyewitness to the events of the saint’s life.  Scholars have declared it to be written contemporaneously with the life of Hilary.  However, as Giovanni Lucchesi has remarked, the Vita’s author followed the normal standards for writing hagiographies in the Middle Ages, which called for the incorporation of miracles, the active participation of angels and demons, and the addition of long, devout speeches and prayers in the text.  In addition, Lucchesi points out that the story of Olibrius’ liberation from demonic possession is a trope found in another hagiographies of the time (such as those associated with Saints Apollonia, Gordian, Cyriacus, Epiphanius, Potitus, Abercius, Vitus, etc.).

Hilary’s following was diffused across Tuscany and Romagna, especially in the dioceses of Arezzo, Sarsina, Forlì, Bertinoro, Faenza, Imola, Modigliana, Fiesole, Florence and at the abbey of Farfa.

Sant'Ellero di Galeata subsequently became a Camaldolese monastery.

References

External links
Hilary of Galeata
Sant' Ellero (Ilaro) di Galeata 

476 births
558 deaths
6th-century Christian saints
Medieval Italian saints
Italian hermits